The 30th World Orienteering Championships was held in Vuokatti, Finland, from 6 to 14 July 2013.

Medalists

Men

Women

Participating countries 
A total of 44 countries participated at this World Championships.

Results

Sprint
The sprint finals were held on 8 July 2013 at Hiukka, Sotkamo.

Men's sprint

Women's sprint

Middle distance
The middle distance finals were held on 12 July 2013 at Koulurinne, Vuokatti.

Men's middle distance

Women's middle distance

Long distance
The long distance finals were held on 9 July 2013 at Kumpula, Sotkamo.

Men's long distance

Women's long distance

Relay
The relay events were held on 13 July 2013 at Koulurinne, Vuokatti.

Men's relay

Women's relay

References 

World Orienteering Championships
2013 in Finnish sport
International sports competitions hosted by Finland
Sotkamo
Orienteering in Finland
July 2013 sports events in Europe